Bergholz  may refer to:

Places
 Bergholz, Mecklenburg-Vorpommern, a municipality in the Uecker-Randow district, in Mecklenburg-Vorpommern, Germany
 Bergholz, Ohio, a village in Jefferson County, United States
 Bergholz Community, a former Amish community at Bergholz, Ohio
 Bergholz, New York, a hamlet in Wheatfield, New York, United States
 Bergholz-Rehbrücke, a former German municipality now part of Nuthetal

People with the surname
 Friedrich Wilhelm von Bergholz, eighteenth century courtier
 Olga Bergholz (1910–1975), a Soviet poet

Other uses
 3093 Bergholz, a main-belt asteroid
 Stadion Bergholz, football stadium in Wil, Switzerland

See also
 Bergholtz (disambiguation)